Cymatura albomaculata is a species of beetle in the family Cerambycidae. It was described by Stephan von Breuning in 1950. It is known from Tanzania, the Democratic Republic of the Congo, Zambia, South Africa, Zimbabwe, and possibly Malawi.

References

Xylorhizini
Beetles described in 1950